John Jacob Winn (February 7, 1898 – February 16, 1974) was an American college football player and coach and circuit judge. He served as the head football coach at the University of Kentucky for one season in 1923, compiling a record of 4–3–2. Winn graduated from Princeton University in 1918. He played football there and was captain of the 1917 Princeton Tigers football team. He was the ends coach at his alma mater in 1920. Winn joined the Kentucky Wildcats football team in 1922 as a line coach under William Juneau.

Head coaching record

References

External links
 

1898 births
1974 deaths
Kentucky Wildcats football coaches
Princeton Tigers football coaches
Princeton Tigers football players
Transylvania Pioneers football coaches
People from Mount Sterling, Kentucky